The Henry House, also known as the Lowry-Ford-Henry House, is a historic antebellum plantation house in Marion, Perry County, Alabama.  Historians believe that the house was built during the 1840s for Squire Lowry, a wealthy planter originally from North Carolina.  The two-story, L-shaped house is wood framed with a brick masonry foundation and columns.  A monumentally scaled hexastyle portico spans the three-bay front facade.  Another two-story, L-shaped portico spans the exposed half of the rear facade and one side of the two-story rear wing.

Bert Ford's family purchased the house from the Lowry family.  It then passed to the Henry family, heirs of the Ford family.  The last individual to own the house was Mary Katherine Blount, a native of Montgomery.  She purchased the house and subsequently donated it to the Perry County Historical and Preservation Society.  It was added to the National Register of Historic Places on September 25, 1986.

References

National Register of Historic Places in Perry County, Alabama
Houses on the National Register of Historic Places in Alabama
Greek Revival houses in Alabama
Plantation houses in Alabama
Houses in Perry County, Alabama
Marion, Alabama